Sirevåg is a village in Hå municipality in Rogaland county, Norway. The village of Ogna sits immediately north of Sirevåg. The Sørlandet Line (traditionally called the Jæren Line) runs through Sirevåg, with the Jæren Commuter Rail stopping at Sirevåg Station.

The main source of income in Sirevåg is shrimp harvesting and processing, fishing, and agriculture.  The main agricultural activities in this area is raising dairy cows, beef cows, pigs, sheep, and fur farming.  Growing potatoes is also common.

Sirevåg has a very large mole/breakwater protecting its harbour.

References

Villages in Rogaland
Hå